Adrian Dabasse (born 27 July 1993) is a French professional footballer who plays as a forward for  club Orléans.

Career
Dabasse came through the youth system at Toulouse and represented Bordeaux at reserve level before signing professional terms with Chamois Niortais in April 2015. He made his senior debut for Niort on 21 August 2015 in the Ligue 2 scoreless draw against Évian TG. His first senior goal came on 29 April 2016 against Tours FC.

In June 2017 Dabasse was loaned to Les Herbiers VF for the 2017–18 seasons, where he went on to play in the 2018 Coupe de France Final.

On 11 October 2019, he joined Championnat National club SO Cholet as a free agent, having been without a club since leaving Niort in the summer. In October 2020, after limited playing time, he joined fellow National club Villefranche.

On 9 June 2022, Dabasse signed with Orléans.

Career statistics

References

External links
 
 Adrian Dabasse profile at foot-national.com
 
 

1993 births
Living people
Footballers from Toulouse
French footballers
Association football forwards
Chamois Niortais F.C. players
Les Herbiers VF players
SO Cholet players
FC Villefranche Beaujolais players
US Orléans players
Championnat National players
Championnat National 2 players
Championnat National 3 players
Ligue 2 players